Sclerolaena eriacantha, commonly known as tall bindii, is a perennial shrub native to inland Australia.

References

eriacantha
Caryophyllales of Australia
Taxa named by Ferdinand von Mueller